State Trooper is a 1933 American pre-Code crime film directed by D. Ross Lederman and starring Regis Toomey.

Cast
 Regis Toomey as Michael Rolph
 Evalyn Knapp as June Brady
 Barbara Weeks as Estelle
 Raymond Hatton as Carter
 Matthew Betz as Jarvis
 Edwin Maxwell as W.J. Brady
 Walter McGrail as Burman
 Lew Kelly as Graber
 Eddy Chandler as Morgan

References

External links
 

1933 films
1933 crime films
American crime films
American black-and-white films
1930s English-language films
Films directed by D. Ross Lederman
1930s American films